The 1976 United Virginia Bank Classic, also known as the Richmond WCT, was a men's tennis tournament played on indoor carpet courts at the Richmond Coliseum in Richmond, Virginia in the United States. The event was part 1976 World Championship Tennis circuit. It was the 11th edition of the tournament and was held from February 4 through February 8, 1976. First-seeded Arthur Ashe won the singles title and earned $17,000 first-prize money as well as 125 ranking points.

Finals

Singles
 Arthur Ashe defeated  Brian Gottfried 6–2, 6–4

Doubles
 Brian Gottfried /  Raúl Ramírez defeated  Arthur Ashe /  Tom Okker 6–4, 7–5

References

External links
 ITF tournament edition details

United Virginia Bank Classic
United Virginia Bank Classic
United Virginia Bank Classic